The 4th arrondissement of Lyon is one of the nine arrondissements of the City of Lyon.

History
The 4th arrondissement of Lyon was created on 24 March 1852 (date of creation of the first five arrondissements), with the same borders of the old town of La Croix-Rousse.

Dominique Bolliet (PS) is currently the mayor of this arrondissement.

Geography and equipments

Area and demography
 
 2006 : 34 302 inhabitants
 Relative density :

Quarters
 Plateau de la Croix-Rousse
 Serin-Gillet
 Gros Caillou

Streets and squares
 Place de la Croix-Rousse
 Boulevard de la Croix-Rousse
 Grande Rue de la Croix-Rousse
 Boulevard des Canuts
 Rue Hénon
 Montée de la Boucle
 Esplanade du Gros Caillou
 Parc de la Cerisaie
 Parc Francis Popy
 Parc du Clos Carret
 Rue d'Austerlitz
 Rue Dumenge

Animation

Sportive equipments
 Stade Grégory Coupet
 le Clos Jouve (Haut lieu de la Boule Lyonnaise)

Monuments and buildings

 Statue de Jacquard
 Jardin Rosa Mir
 Villa Gillet
 Maison Brunet
 Sculpture Le Chant des Canuts, a 1984 statue made by Georges Salendre, and installed in a square near the city hall

Art
 Théâtre de la Croix-Rousse
 Maison des Canuts

Events
 Every day except Monday, the market in La Croix-Rousse (a bio market on Saturday morning), located along the boulevard de la Croix-Rousse, on nearly 1 km
 Every Saturday and Sunday morning, the town crier
 Every year in September, the harvest of the République des Canuts (Parc de la Cerisaie)
 Every year in October and November, the chestnuts vogue
 During the second weekend of September, the Grande Braderie, located the Grande Rue and the Place de la Croix-Rousse

Transports
This zone is served by :
 Metro line 
 Buses : 2, 33, 45, 61
 Trolleys : 6, 13, 18

See also 
 List of the streets in Lyon
 Lyon
 Arrondissement of Lyon
 History of Lyon

References

External links 

 Official website